Robert Alexandru Vâlceanu (born 29 March 1997) is a Romanian professional footballer who plays as an attacking midfielder or a winger.

Club career

Steaua București
Vâlceanu scored a free kick goal on his Liga I debut on 15 March 2014, in the 3–0 home victory over Gaz Metan Mediaș.

Astra Giurgiu
On 30 May 2017, Vâlceanu was loaned out to Astra Giurgiu for the following two seasons. However, five days later the player announced that it would actually be a full transfer.

Career statistics

Club

Honours

Club
Steaua București
Liga I: 2013–14, 2014–15
Cupa României: 2014–15
Cupa Ligii: 2014-15, 2015–16

References

External links
 
 

1997 births
Living people
Footballers from Bucharest
Romanian footballers
Association football midfielders
Liga I players
Liga II players
FC Steaua București players
FC Voluntari players
FC UTA Arad players
FC Astra Giurgiu players
FC Metaloglobus București players
AFC Dacia Unirea Brăila players
Romania youth international footballers